Bogoslovo is a rural locality (a selo) in Nikolskoye Rural Settlement, Ust-Kubinsky District, Vologda Oblast, Russia. The population was 78 as of 2002. There are 3 streets.

Geography 
Bogoslovo is located 23 km northwest of Ustye (the district's administrative centre) by road. Vecheslovo is the nearest rural locality.

References 

Rural localities in Ust-Kubinsky District